is a 1960 Japanese film directed by Nagisa Ōshima. The Sun's Burial is known for its elements of Japanese nuberu bagu. The Sun's Burial depicts people at the bottom of the social pyramid.

Isao Sasaki was selected for one of the lead roles and made his acting debut in the film.

Cast
 Kayoko Hono as Hanako
 Isao Sasaki as Takeshi
 Masahiko Tsugawa as Shin
 Fumio Watanabe as Yosehei
 Kamatari Fujiwara as Batasuke
 Tanie Kitabayashi as Chika
 Jun Hamamura as Goro Murata
 Rokkō Toura as Masa
 Asao Koike as Iromegane
 Eitarō Ozawa as Doranya
 Junzaburō Ban as Yosematsu
 Kunie Tanaka as Thief
 Ichirō Nagai as Yari
 Hōsei Komatsu as Beggar
 Gen Shimizu as Boss of the Ohama clan
 Kei Sato as Sakaguchi
 Bokuzen Hidari as Bataya
 Yūsuke Kawazu as Yasu

References

External links
The Sun's Burial at Shochiku

1960 films
1960s Japanese-language films
Shochiku films
Films directed by Nagisa Ōshima
1960s Japanese films